Mates on the Road is a live album by Australian country music artist John Williamson with fiddle player Pixie Jenkins and country music singer Warren H. Williams. The album was recorded during the True Blue Reunion tour in support on the 2003 album True Blue Two. The album was released on 2xCD and on DVD in February 2004.

Track listing

Charts

Release history

References

2004 live albums
John Williamson (singer) albums
EMI Records live albums
Live albums by Australian artists